Cheng Changsong is a male Chinese racing cyclist.

See also
China at the 2012 Summer Olympics - Cycling
Cycling at the 2012 Summer Olympics – Men's team sprint

References

1985 births
Living people
Chinese male cyclists
Cyclists at the 2012 Summer Olympics
Olympic cyclists of China
Cyclists from Jiangsu
Asian Games medalists in cycling
Cyclists at the 2010 Asian Games
Medalists at the 2010 Asian Games
Asian Games gold medalists for China
21st-century Chinese people